Sajni, (also spelled as Sajani or Sajini), is a 2007 Indian Kannada film directed by Murugesh. The film stars Dhyan, Sharmila Mandre and Anant Nag in lead roles. lead actress Sharmila Mandre makes her Kannada debut through this film. The film is produced by Sonali Nikhil and Sunanda Murali Manohar. The film is the Kannada remake of 
Tamil film Jodi which was released in 1999. For the first time in Kannada cinema, the film featured a soundtrack composed by A. R. Rahman with all compositions re-used from Rahman's Tamil film Jodi which in turn had re-used the tracks from Rahman's Hindi movie Doli Saja Ke Rakhna.
The film released statewide on 23 February 2007.

Cast
 Sameer Dattani as Vikram (credited as Dhyan)
 Sharmila Mandre as Sajni
 Anant Nag as Ananth Murthy
 Avinash as Vikram's father
 Bhavya as Ananth Murthy's sister
 Amulya as Vikram's sister
 Shivaram as Grandfather
 M. S. Umesh as Secretary
 Master Anand
 Himanshu Malik as Singer Kailash
 Chaya Singh in a cameo appearance

Soundtrack

The official soundtrack contains six songs re-used from A. R. Rahman's Jodi soundtrack, which itself reused some songs of his earlier Bollywood film Doli Saja Ke Rakhna.

Reception 
The movie was  not well received in Kannada as the acting skills of the newly introduced leads fell short of the original.

References

External links 
 
 movie review

2007 films
2000s Kannada-language films
Kannada remakes of Tamil films
Films scored by A. R. Rahman